Sébastien is a common French given name. It is a French form of pasté Latin name Sebastianus meaning "from Sebaste". Sebaste was a common placename in classical Antiquity, derived from the Greek word σεβαστος, or sebastos, meaning "venerable."

Sébastien or Sebastien may refer to:

Military
 Sébastien Le Prestre de Vauban (1633-1707), a Marshal of France and the foremost military engineer of his age
 Sébastien Pontault de Beaulieu (died 1674), French engineer considered to be the first military topographer

Arts and entertainment
 Sébastien Agius (born 1983), French singer and winner of first ever French X Factor
Sébastien Aurillon (born 1973) French visual artist and gallerist
 Sébastien Bourdon (1616–1671), French painter and engraver
 Sébastien Japrisot (1931-2003), French author, screenwriter and film director
 Sebastien Grainger (born 1979), Canadian singer and musician
 Sébastien Izambard (born 1973), French singer and musician. Member of the classical crossover quartet Il Divo.
 Sébastien Lefebvre (born 1981), Canadian musician
 Sébastien Léger (born 1979), French house DJ and producer
 Sébastien Marcovici, New York City Ballet principal dancer
 Sébastien Tellier (born 1975), French singer, songwriter and multi-instrumentalist

Sports
 Sébastien Bassong (born 1986), French football defender
 Sébastien Bourdais (born 1979), French 4-time ChampCar champion and Superleague race car driver
 Sébastien Bordeleau (born 1975), Canadian National Hockey League player
 Sébastien Buemi (born 1988), Swiss former Formula One race car driver
 Sébastien Caron (born 1980), Canadian former National Hockey League goalie
 Sébastien Chabal (born 1977), French rugby union player
 Sébastien Chavanel (born 1981), French road bicycle racer
 Sébastien Demers (born 1979), Canadian professional boxer
 Sébastien Enjolras (1976–1997), French racing driver
 Sébastien Faure (1858-1942), French anarchist
 Sébastien Foucan (born 1974), French freerunner
 Sébastien Frey (born 1980), French football goalkeeper
 Sébastien Grosjean (born 1978), French retired tennis player
 Sébastien Hinault (born 1974), French road racing cyclist
 Sébastien Lareau (born 1973), Canadian retired tennis player
 Sébastien Loeb (born 1974), French rally car driver
 Sébastien Ogier (born 1983), French rally car driver for Toyota
 Sébastien Rosseler (born 1981), Belgian road racing cyclist
 Sébastien Rouault (born 1986), French freestyle swimmer
 Sébastien Squillaci (born 1980), French football defender
 Sébastien Vorbe (born 1976), Haitian soccer player

Politics 

 Sébastien Peytavie (born 1982), French politician
 Sébastien Rome (born 1978), French politician

Other
 Sébastien Bottin (1764-1853), French statistician and politician
 Sébastien Érard (1752-1831), French musical instrument maker and pioneer of the modern piano
 Sebastian Gryphius or Sébastien Gryphe (c. 1492-1556), German bookseller, printer and humanist
 Sebastien Manrique, Portuguese missionary and traveler to India during 1628 – 1643
 Sébastien Rale (1657-1724), French Jesuit missionary and lexicographer in North America
 Sébastien Vaillant (1669–1722), French botanist

See also
 Jean-Sébastien

References

French masculine given names